Sara Stockbridge (born Sarah Jane Stockbridge; 14 November 1965) is an English model, actress and author. In the second half of the 1980s, she was the muse of fashion designer Vivenne Westwood.

Early life 
Stockbridge was born in Woking, Surrey, England. Her father was a civil engineer. Sara and her brother spent their early childhood with their family living in Trinidad, Bahrain and Peru before returning to Woking in the late 1970s.

Career

Modelling 
Stockbridge moved to London aged 18 and was taken on by Models 1. A couple of years later, she modelled for Vivienne Westwood.
The first fashion show she worked as model at was Mini Crini, Spring/Summer 1985. Afterwards Westwood asked her to front a music project called Choice. She appeared on the cover of i-D and Blitz magazines.

Sara modelled as Tank Girl for a series of promotional photos by photographer Paul Spencer, aiming to be cast as Tank Girl in the movie of the same name. Although she did not get the part, the photos became well known and were seen on the covers of magazines such as Elle, Vogue and The Face. She appeared as a shorn headed dominatrix in the British comedy film U.F.O.. In the film Oh Marbella! she plays the rich wife of a businessman at a nude resort in Spain.
Stockbridge is still active in the modelling / acting world, and recently she returned for appearances on Westwood's catwalk, and in British Vogue.

Writing 
Her first novel Hammer was published in 2009, and her second novel Cross My Palm in 2011.

Personal life 
Her son Max was born in 1990. She also has a daughter, Lelu.
At 45 she married Cobalt Stargazer, lead guitarist with Zodiac Mindwarp and the Love Reaction. Together they formed a new band, Rooster, with Godwin Nwafor of Alabama 3.

Filmography

Films 
Split Second (1992) – Tiffany
Carry On Columbus (1992) – Nina the Model
U.F.O. (1993) – Zoe
Interview with the Vampire (1994) – Estelle
Go Now (1995) – Bridget
The Imitators (1996) – The Dream Space Baby
24 Hours in London (2000) – Simone
Best (2000) – Night Huntress
The Wedding Tackle (2000) – Felicity
Bridget Jones's Diary (2001) – Melinda
Spider (2002) – Gladys
Oh Marbella! (2003) – Maggie
Rag Tale (2005) – Sally May
Intervention (2007) – Sarah
Inconceivable (2008) – Trixie 'Trix' Bell
Enter the Void (2009) – Suzy
The Making of Plus One (2010) – Rusty Robinson

Television 
Red Dwarf (1992, Episode: "Terrorform") – Handmaiden
Comic Strip Presents (1992–1993) – Helen / Shaaron / Sonia / Janet
Glam Metal Detectives (1995) – Sara / Maisie
The Bill (1995-2002) – Gail Stuart / Liz Terry / Carol Tate / Fran
EastEnders (1996) – Louise
David (1997, biblical telefilm) – Witch of Endor
Lucy Sullivan Is Getting Married (1999–2000) – Megan
Grange Hill (2002) - Suzie Gilks
Tipping the Velvet (2002, BBC Film) – Dickie

Music 
Adam Ant's Music Video – "Room at the Top"
Glam Metal Detectives' single "Everybody Up!"
Blur's promotional video "Country House"
Betty Boo's promotional video "Hangover"
Duran Duran's promotional video "Electric Barbarella" – 1997
Gun's promotional video "Taking on the World"

References

External links 
 

1966 births
Living people
people from Woking
English film actresses
English female models
Place of birth missing (living people)